Clare Cavanagh (born May 23, 1956) is an American literary critic, a Slavist, and a translator. She is the Frances Hooper Professor in the Arts and Humanities and Chair of the Department of Slavic Languages and Literatures at Northwestern University. An acclaimed translator of contemporary Polish poetry, she is currently under contract to write the authorized biography of Czesław Miłosz. She holds a B.A from the University of California, Santa Cruz, and an M.A. and PhD from Harvard University (1978, 1981 and 1988 respectively). Before coming to Northwestern University, she taught at the University of Wisconsin, Madison. Her work has been translated into Russian, Polish, Hungarian, French, Dutch, Chinese, and Japanese.

She has published a paper about post-colonial literature of Poland.

Awards and honors

Her honors include: the National Book Critics Circle Award for Criticism for Lyric Poetry and Modern Politics: Russia, Poland, and the West. the William Riley Parker Prize of the Modern Language Association; the AATSEEL Prize for Outstanding Scholarly Book in Slavic Literature; the Ilchester Lecture in Slavonic Literatures, Oxford University; the John Frederick Nims Memorial Prize in Translation; the Katharine Washburne Memorial Lecture in Translation; the PEN/Book-of-the Month Club Prize for Outstanding Literary Translation; the AATSEEL Award for Outstanding Translation from a Slavic Language; elected to the American Academy of Arts and Sciences in 2019. Cavanagh's essays and translations “have appeared in TLS, The New York Times Book Review, The New Republic, The New Yorker, The New York Review of Books, Bookforum, Partisan Review, Common Knowledge, Poetry, Literary Imagination and other periodicals.”

Selected bibliography

Books

Czeslaw Milosz and His Age: A Critical Life. Under contract, Farrar Straus, Giroux.
Lyric Poetry and Modern Politics: Russia, Poland, and the West. Yale University Press (January 5, 2010), 
Osip Mandelstam and the Modernist Creation of Tradition. Princeton University Press (November 14, 1994),

Edited books
Princeton Encyclopedia of Poetry and Poetics, Roland Greene, editor-in-chief, Stephen Cushman, general editor, Clare Cavanagh, Jahan Ramazani, Paul Rouzer, associate editors, Princeton University Press, 2012.

Translations

Map: Collected and Last Poems, Wislawa Szymborska, ed. Clare Cavanagh, tr. Clare Cavanagh, Stanislaw Baranczak. Houghton Mifflin Harcourt (April 7, 2015), 
Unseen Hand: Poems, Adam Zagajewski, tr. Clare Cavanagh. Farrar, Straus and Giroux; Reprint edition (June 5, 2012), 
Here, Wislawa Szymborska, tr. Clare Cavanagh, Stanislaw Baranczak. Mariner Books (August 7, 2012), 
Eternal Enemies, Adam Zagajewski, tr. Clare Cavanagh. Farrar, Straus and Giroux (March 31, 2009), 
Monologue of a Dog, Wislawa Szymborska.  Co-translator with Stanislaw Baranczak. Foreword by former U.S. Poet Laureate Billy Collins. Harcourt (November 7, 2005), 
A Defense of Ardor, Adam Zagajewski, tr. Clare Cavanagh.  Farrar Straus Giroux (October 19, 2004), 
Nonrequired Reading: Selected Prose, Wislawa Szymborska, tr. Clare Cavanagh.  Houghton Mifflin Harcourt (October 28, 2002), 
View with a Grain of Sand: Selected Poems, Wislawa Szymborska, co-tr. Clare Cavanagh with Stanislaw Baranczak. Harcourt Brace (May 26, 1995), 
Spoiling Cannibals' Fun: Polish Poetry of the Last Two Decades of Communist Rule, ed. and tr. Clare Cavanagh with Stanislaw Baranczak. Northwestern University Press, (December 1991),

See also
 Russian Literature
 Osip Mandelstam
 Adam Zagajewski
 Wisława Szymborska
 Czesław Miłosz
 Joseph Brodsky
20th-century lyric poetry
Culture during the Cold War
American poetry
Russian poetry
Polish poetry
Literary criticism
Translation
Modernist poetry
Stanisław Barańczak
National Book Critics Circle Award

References

External links
 Faculty Webpage

1956 births
Living people
American literary critics
Women literary critics
Northwestern University faculty
Slavists
English
Harvard University alumni
20th-century translators
20th-century American women writers
American women academics
21st-century American women
American women critics